California Pacific may refer to:
California Pacific Airlines, a former airline
California Pacific Computer Company, a defunct computer game publisher
California Pacific Medical Center, a large campus of four hospitals in Northern California
California Pacific Railroad, a 19th-century railroad company
California Pacific University, a former distance learning university
CalPac (airline), a former division of Mesa Airlines